Baydad (also spelled Bagdates), was a dynast (frataraka) of Persis from 164 to 146 BC.

Background 

Since the end of the 3rd or the beginning of the 2nd century BCE, Persis had been ruled by local dynasts subject to the Seleucid Empire. They held the ancient Persian title of frataraka ("leader, governor, forerunner"), which is also attested in the Achaemenid-era. The Achaemenid Empire, which had a century earlier ruled most of the Near East, originated from the region. The frataraka themselves emphasized their close affiliation with the prominent Achaemenid King of Kings, and their court was probably at the former Achaemenid capital of Persepolis, where they financed construction projects on and near the Achaemenid plateau. The frataraka had traditionally been regarded as priestly dynasts or advocates of religious (and political) opposition to Hellenism, however, this is no longer considered the case.

Chronology of the frataraka 
The traditional view of the chronology of the frataraka dynasts was originally; Baydad, Ardakhshir I, Wahbarz, Wadfradad I and Wadfradad II. However, recent findings of Persis coins have led to more a likely chronology; Ardakhshir I, Wahbarz, Wadfradad I, Baydad and Wadfradad II.

Rule
On the reverse of his coins, Bagadates is depicted standing in front of a Zoroastrian fire-altar, or seated in majesty holding a staff of authority and possibly a pomegranate in his left hand (illustration, left).

In his coinage, Bagadates has his portrait on the obverse, wearing the satrapal headdress and the Hellenistic diadem. On the reverse, he is either shown enthroned, or making his devotions to a fire temple. The weight standard of the coins is the Attic standard, and the tetradrachm is the usual coin size, as was the usual case in the Seleucid empire. The coins are inscribed in Aramaic with the name of the ruler.

References

Sources
 .
 
 
 
 
 
 

Seleucid satraps
2nd-century BC rulers in Asia
2nd-century BC Iranian people
Zoroastrian rulers
Frataraka rulers of Persis